Seeg is a municipality  in the district of Ostallgäu in Bavaria in Germany.

Gallery

Notable people
 Irene Epple (1957), German alpine skier.

References 

Ostallgäu